Mask of the Demon may refer to:

 Black Sunday (1960 film) (Italian: La maschera del demonio, trans. The Mask of the Demon), a 1960 Italian gothic horror film 
 Mask of the Demon (album), a 2011 album by Sutter Kain with his protege Donnie Darko